Below are listed political parties registered at the Ministry of Interior of Spain from 1976 to 1984.

Note that:
 The Ministry does not appear to remove registrations if parties are dissolved or become dormant, and a large part of the groups mentioned no longer exists today.
 In several cases the groups listed were electoral alliances formed to contest a specific election.
 In several cases, the registered parties are regional affiliates or branches of a nationwide party.
 Some of the organizations listed are not political parties per se. For example, a handful of youth wings of political parties are listed.
 Parties listed in the order by which they were registered.

The listing

1976

1977

1978

1979

1980

1981

1982

1983

1984

Registered political parties